Arnave is a commune in the Ariège department of southwestern France.

Geography

Arnave is situated in the Pyrenees and is served by Highway D20.

Arnave was built on the banks of a stream by the same name. It is fed by two other streams, the Ruisseau de la Sécaille and, further downstream, the Ruisseau de la Montagne. The former descends by way of Cazenave-Serres-et-Allens and its source is at  the base of le Pic du Han. The source of the latter is further to the north and on the other side of the Cazenave mountain, at the Lauzate peak. The Arnave stream is also fed by other smaller streams and springs. The Arnave stream itself empties into the river Ariège four kilometres downstream from the town of Arnave, at the site of Bompas, Ariège.

The Arnave stream winds through high valleys with many waterfalls, some of which are impressive. One in particular is known as "la poêle" (the "stovetop" or "frying pan") for its being difficult to access.

Population

Inhabitants of Arnave are called Arnavais. In 2010 the town counted 217 inhabitants. Censuses of the town going back to 1793 have tracked the change in population. Starting in the 21st century, French municipalities with a population under 10,000 undergo a survey every 5 years, compared with annual surveys in larger municipalities.

Sites and monuments
The Chapel Saint-Paul d'Arnave is an example of Romanesque Architecture and is considered one of the oldest in the department. The building dates to the 10th and 11th centuries. Jules d'Ancelin, the baron of Labaume, is interred here. The chapel was part of the Labaume Barony until the mid-20th century, when it was ceded to the town for restoration. The site is also known for its black stone, believed to cure "Haut-Mal", or epilepsy, when the afflicted sleeps an entire night with his head beneath it. The site was a longtime pilgrimage destination thanks to legends of miraculous cures.

A gypsum quarry from the last century is known for anhydrite specimens.

References

Communes of Ariège (department)